Mugen Rao (born in 1994 or 1995) is a Malaysian Indian singer and film actor in Tamil films. In 2019 he was the winner of Season 3 of Bigg Boss Tamil. He is sometimes known as MGR.

Personal life
Rao was born in Kuala Lumpur, Malaysia, one of three children. His father, Prakash Rao, died in 2020.

Career
He began his singing career with his father, a stage singer. He made his acting debut in the Malay TV show Senandung Malam, then had small parts in films including Gerak Khas and Ghora, in shorts, TV films, and advertising.

Rao's career took off in 2016, when his music video "Kayalvizhi" went viral on YouTube. His later music videos include "Anbe Aruyire", "Pogiren", "Mayakkurriye", and "Oththa Thamarai", which was shot in 2022 using virtual production technology.

In 2019, he was the first Malaysian contestant on Bigg Boss Tamil edition, and emerged as the winner. He then moved to Chennai and sought to break into Kollywood.

He signed a three-film deal in 2020, and was announced at the time to have a leading role in Vettri. He played the lead in Velan, directed by Kavin Moorthy and released in December 2021. In 2022, he began filming Mathil Mel Kadhal alongside Divya Bharathi.

Filmography

Films

Short films

Television

Actor

Reality shows (non fiction)

Discography

Singer

Lyricist

Independent work and music videos

References

External links
 

1990s births
Living people
Malaysian people
Bigg Boss (Tamil TV series) contestants
Big Brother (franchise) winners
21st-century Indian actors
21st-century Indian male actors
Indian television actors